The 1988 UAAP men's basketball tournament was the 51st year of the men's tournament of the University Athletic Association of the Philippines (UAAP)'s basketball championship. Hosted by De La Salle University, the Ateneo Blue Eagles defeated the De La Salle Green Archers in the finals defending their first UAAP men's basketball championship: it was the first UAAP finals series for the Ateneo–La Salle rivalry that originated in the NCAA (Philippines).

Tournament format 
 Double round robin; the two teams with the best records advance Finals:
 The #1 seed will only need to win once to clinch the championship.
 The #2 seed has to win twice to clinch the championship.

Elimination round 

Ateneo abandoned its game against the University of the Philippines (UP) with the Fighting Maroons leading 83–69 1:21 left in the game when a melee broke out involving Ateneo's Joseph Canlas and UP's Joseph Marata. The referees ejected Canlas after he tripped Marata, then the two players traded punches that led to a bench-clearing situation. An unidentified spectator fired a gun, who was escorted out of the Rizal Memorial Coliseum by UP baseball coach and police officer Boy Codiñera.

With the system currently in place, Ateneo would've forfeited the game and received no points (a loss under ordinary circumstances merited one point, two points for a win); however, Ateneo coach Fritz Gaston appealed the decision to the UAAP Board  which was granted, ruling the game as an ordinary loss for Ateneo and giving them one point.

Finals
Ateneo clinched the twice-to-beat advantage in the elimination round finale which served as a de facto Game 1 of a best-of-3 series with a win against La Salle.

La Salle, led by Dindo Pumaren, had a ten-point advantage midway through the first half, 21–11. However, Ateneo caught up with them and kept the score close until the final deadlock at 66–all when Ateneo started an 8–2 run. Joseph Canlas scored four of Ateneo's eight points in the run, which ended with a Gilbert Reyes conversion off a steal from Joey Santa Maria. Pumaren closed the gap to four points at 74–70, with two free throws off Joseph Kenneth Nieto, but the Blue Eagles prevented further scoring opportunities for La Salle; Santa Maria fouled Daniel Francisco, who converted his two free-throws to give Ateneo the win, and a successful defense of their championship. Their back-to-back title run was their first successful title defense since the 1975 and 1976 NCAA seasons.

See also
NCAA Season 64 basketball tournaments

References

51
1988 in Philippine basketball